"Long Lost Friend" is a song recorded by American country music group Restless Heart.  It was released in January 1991 as the fourth and final single from the album Fast Movin' Train.  The song reached number 16 on the Billboard Hot Country Singles & Tracks chart. It also peaked at number 6 on the Canadian RPM Country Tracks. The band's lead singer, Larry Stewart, wrote it with Steve Bogard and Dave Robbins.

Chart performance

Year-end charts

References

1991 singles
Restless Heart songs
Song recordings produced by Scott Hendricks
RCA Records Nashville singles
Songs written by Steve Bogard
Songs written by Dave Robbins (keyboardist)
1990 songs